This is the discography of American contemporary Christian and Latin pop singer Jaci Velasquez. She has released 17 studio albums, 3 compilation albums, and numerous singles since 1996.

Albums

Independent albums

Studio albums

Compilation albums

Extended plays

Singles

As lead artist

As featured artist

Notes

References

External links

Christian music discographies
Discographies of American artists
Latin pop music discographies
Pop music discographies